Lara Grangeon (born 21 September 1991) is a French swimmer from the territory of New Caledonia who competes in the individual medley and butterfly events. At the 2012 Summer Olympics she finished 18th overall in the heats in the 400 metre individual medley and failed to reach the final.

Due to the New Caledonia's status as an overseas territory of France, Grangeon competes for New Caledonia in regional (Pacific) competitions and for France in continental and global competitions. At the 2011 Pacific Games in Nouméa, New Caledonia, Grangeon entered all twenty women's events (including one open water event) and won a medal in all of them, including sixteen golds. At the 2007 and 2011 Games, Grangeon swam on several relay teams together with Diane Bui Duyet, who also represents both France and New Caledonia.

At the 2015 European Short Course Championships in Netanya, Israel, Grangeon broke the French record in the 400 meter individual medley with a time of 4:29.14. She won the bronze medal. Earlier in 2015 at the French Championships in Limoges, she had already broken the long course French record in this event. In 2016, she again broke the long-course record, with a time of 4:36.61 at the French Championships and Olympic trials in Montpellier.  At the 2016 Olympics, she competed in the 200 m butterfly and the 400 m individual medley.

She has qualified to represent France at the 2020 Summer Olympics, and competed the 10 km open water marathon.

References

External links

1991 births
Living people
People from Nouméa
French female backstroke swimmers
Olympic swimmers of France
Swimmers at the 2012 Summer Olympics
Swimmers at the 2016 Summer Olympics
French female breaststroke swimmers
French female butterfly swimmers
French female freestyle swimmers
French female medley swimmers
New Caledonian female swimmers
Mediterranean Games silver medalists for France
Swimmers at the 2009 Mediterranean Games
European Aquatics Championships medalists in swimming
Mediterranean Games medalists in swimming
World Aquatics Championships medalists in open water swimming

Swimmers at the 2020 Summer Olympics
20th-century French women
21st-century French women
Swimmers at the 2022 Mediterranean Games